Nguyễn Văn Tùng (born 2 June 2001) is a Vietnamese professional footballer who is a forward for V.League 1 club Hà Nội and the Vietnam national under-23 team.

International goals

Vietnam U19

Vietnam U23

Honours
Hà Nội
V.League 1: 2022
Vietnamese National Cup: 2022
Vietnam U23
 AFF U-23 Championship: 2022
 Southeast Asian Games: 2021

References

2001 births
Living people
Vietnamese footballers
Sportspeople from Hanoi
Hanoi FC players
V.League 1 players
Vietnam international footballers
Association football central defenders
Competitors at the 2021 Southeast Asian Games
Southeast Asian Games competitors for Vietnam
21st-century Vietnamese people